Easton railway station was the terminus of the Portland Branch Railway, which operated on the Isle of Portland in the south of the English county of Dorset. The station opened with the Easton and Church Hope Railway, one of the constituent parts of a complex line, on 1 September 1902. The line past Portland station was technically a separate railway, although the branch was operated as one line throughout. 
Easton was closed from 11 November 1940 to 1 January 1945 following air raid damage. 
Although the station closed to passengers in 1952 regular freight kept the line in use until 1965. The station was demolished in the 1970s.

The site today

The area is now the site of a residential home for the elderly.

References

 
 
 
 Station on navigable O.S. map

Isle of Portland
Disused railway stations in Dorset
Former Easton and Church Hope Railway stations
Railway stations in Great Britain opened in 1902
Railway stations in Great Britain closed in 1940
Railway stations in Great Britain opened in 1945
Railway stations in Great Britain closed in 1952